Rora is a surname and given name. Notable people known by that name include the following:

Surname
Dino Rora (1945–1966), Italian swimmer
Krasnodar Rora (1945–2020), Croatian football player and manager
Shigihara Rōra, Japanese name of Laura Shigihara, American singer-songwriter, video game developer, composer, and Twitch streamer

Nickname
Rora-rora, name given to Kalola Pupuka-o-Honokawailani, Hawaiian high chiefess
Rora Asim Khan, alternate name of Aurora Nilsson, (1894–1972), Swedish writer

See also

Rola (name)
Rora (disambiguation)
Roro (name)